Archibald MacKinnon (born January 13, 1937 in Cranbrook, British Columbia) is a Canadian competition rower and Olympic champion.

He received a gold medal in coxless fours at the 1956 Summer Olympics in Melbourne, together with Lorne Loomer, Walter D'Hondt and Donald Arnold.

At the 1958 British Empire and Commonwealth Games, MacKinnon received a gold medal in eights. He received a silver medal in eights at the 1960 Summer Olympics in Rome, as a member of the Canadian team.

Awards
MacKinnon was inducted into the Canada's Sports Hall of Fame in 1957,
 the BC Sports Hall of Fame in 1966, and into University of British Columbia Sports Hall of Fame in 1993, together with the other members of the Olympic gold team.

References

External links
 
 
 
 
 
 

1937 births
Living people
Canadian male rowers
Olympic rowers of Canada
Olympic gold medalists for Canada
Olympic silver medalists for Canada
Rowers at the 1956 Summer Olympics
Rowers at the 1960 Summer Olympics
Olympic medalists in rowing
Medalists at the 1956 Summer Olympics
Medalists at the 1960 Summer Olympics
Sportspeople from British Columbia
Sportspeople from Cranbrook, British Columbia
Commonwealth Games medallists in rowing
Commonwealth Games gold medallists for Canada
Rowers at the 1958 British Empire and Commonwealth Games
Medallists at the 1958 British Empire and Commonwealth Games